A charity record or charity single is a song released by musicians with most or all proceeds raised going to a dedicated foundation or charity.

George Harrison's "Bangla Desh" single in 1971 is commonly acknowledged as the first ever purpose-made charity single – in this case to help fund relief efforts following the 1970 Bhola cyclone and the Bangladesh Liberation War. The money raised was donated to UNICEF, as were takings from Harrison's all-star charity concert (again, the first of its kind) held at Madison Square Garden, New York, and its spin-off live album and concert film. This is one way of using artistic talent as art for charity.

Some of the other early charity records came from the January 1979 Music for UNICEF Concert, with the likes of ABBA's "Chiquitita" and the Bee Gees' "Too Much Heaven" released as singles, all the royalties from which went to UNICEF. Band Aid's "Do They Know It's Christmas?" in November 1984 began the revolution of the charity record, which would be popularised throughout the 1980s.

In the United States, charity records reached their peak with USA for Africa's "We Are the World" in 1985, but then essentially died out afterwards. In the United Kingdom, however, charity singles (especially Comic Relief), have become annual hits.

Purpose-made "charity singles" however were not the first charity records. As early as 1956, The Lord's Taveners released a 78 rpm disc which contained six tracks donated by popular artists at the time.
This was made with the gratitude of The Decca Record Company and the entire profits of the record together with the royalties and fees from artists, publishers, etc., were donated to The National Playing Fields Association. This was the first charity record to make the UK charts and reached Number 2. Due to its success, it was followed by a second compilation in 1957.

Notable charity singles

1970s

1980s

1990s

2000s

2010s

2020s

References

 
Lists of songs